The Cacua language, also known as Kakua or Kakwa, is an indigenous language spoken by a few hundred people in Colombia and Brazil.  There are many monolinguals, especially children. Apart from being close to or a dialect of Nukak, its classification is uncertain.

Overview
The people have traditional livelihoods such as nomadic hunting-gathering and swidden agriculture. There are some non-native speakers of Cacua that are predominantly missionary workers. Their presence has resulted in the translation of religious Christian texts, notably the Christian Bible.

Distribution
(In Spanish: Departamento del Vaupés). A second Kakua settlement is "Nuevo Pueblo" (New Town), which is an inland forest village between the Vaupés and the Papurí rivers.

Classification
There are two dialects: Vaupés Cacua and Macú-Paraná Cacua.  Cacua is mutually intelligible with Nukak, and is considered a dialect of the latter by Martins (1999).  See that article for further classification.

Other names for this language include: Bára, Cakua, Kákwa, Macu de Cubeo, Macu de Desano, Macu de Guanano, Macú-Paraná, Wacara.

Phonology 
Kakwa has 6 vowels: /a, e, i, ɨ, o, u/. The /o/ sound occurs only marginally in the Wacara dialect, while being attested for the Nuevo Pueblo dialect. In nasal contexts only five vowels can occur.

Kakwa has seventeen consonants: 

Nasalization in Kakwa is a prosodic property of the morpheme that affects all segments within each morpheme except voiceless stops and glottalized palatal glide in initial position. Each morpheme is either completely nasal or completely oral.

Kakwa is a tonal language and displays 3 contrastive phonological tones: Rising (LH), falling] (HL), and low (L).

Grammar
The language uses both subject-object-verb and object-verb-subject word order.

Bilingualism and literacy
Reports gathered by SIL in 1982 stated that many speakers are monolingual, particularly children. Another promising aspect is that even though literacy is low by international standards, it is higher in the aboriginal language, at around 10%, compared to 5% in Spanish, the opposite situation of most indigenous languages of the Americas.  Cacua uses a Latin alphabet.

Sample text
Ded pah jwiít jwĩ jwíih cãac cha pahatji naáwát

References 

Phonology and grammar

External links 
Colombian Languages Collection of Katherine Bolaños Quiñonez at the Archive of the indigenous Languages of Latin America. Contains 43 archival recordings of over 1 hour of spoken Kakwa.
 

Languages of Colombia
Languages of Brazil
Endangered indigenous languages of the Americas
Nadahup languages
Kakua–Nukak languages